The 2009–10 Northern Counties East Football League season was the 28th in the history of Northern Counties East Football League, a football competition in England.

Premier Division

The Premier Division featured 18 clubs which competed in the previous season, along with two new clubs, promoted from Division One:
Rainworth Miners Welfare
Scarborough Athletic

League table

Division One

Division One featured 17 clubs which competed in the previous season, along with one new club, relegated from the Premier Division:
Eccleshill United

League table

References

External links
 Northern Counties East Football League

2009-10
9